Central United Methodist Church is located at 201 East Third Avenue in Knoxville, Tennessee.  On November 9, 2005, it was added to the National Register of Historic Places, and is listed as a contributing property within the Fourth and Gill Historic District.

The church was organized in 1924 as a merger between Broad Street Methodist and Centenary Methodist churches after a fire destroyed the Broad Street building.  The present structure was completed in 1927 in the Gothic Revival style. Baumann & Baumann of Knoxville were the architects.   The exterior of the church is primarily brick, but also includes stone, limestone and marble.  At the time of its completion, the sanctuary was Knoxville's largest church auditorium, seating 1,600.  The original organ was purchased from the Riviera Theater in 1935.  The current organ is an instrument by M.P. Moller of 42 ranks installed in 1958.

The congregation is affiliated with the United Methodist Church.

References

External links
 National Register of Historic Places
 Central United Methodist Church website
 UMC National Website: Central United Methodist Church Info

Churches on the National Register of Historic Places in Tennessee
Churches in Knoxville, Tennessee
United Methodist churches in Tennessee
National Register of Historic Places in Knoxville, Tennessee